Panagiotis Koulingas (born 31 March 1946) is a Greek sailor. He competed at the 1964 Summer Olympics and the 1968 Summer Olympics.

References

External links
 

1946 births
Living people
Greek male sailors (sport)
Olympic sailors of Greece
Sailors at the 1964 Summer Olympics – Finn
Sailors at the 1968 Summer Olympics – Finn
Sailors (sport) from Athens